Weldon Drew (April 22, 1935 – November 22, 2012) was the head men's basketball coach at New Mexico State University from 1979 to 1985. He was named to the position in 1979 as the successor to Ken Hayes who left to become head coach at Oral Roberts University. Drew was previously an assistant coach for New Mexico State University from 1975 to 1979. Drew came to NMSU after coaching high school basketball for Houston's Kashmere High School (485–135 record in 18 seasons), where he left with a 78-game winning streak after winning two consecutive Texas 4A state championships and the high school national championship. Drew also won national coach of the year in 1975. The NMSU job was Drew's first head coaching position at the college level. Drew was the 20th person to hold the head coaching position in the Aggie basketball history. After a dismal 1984–85 season, Drew was fired. He then went to be an assistant coach at Oklahoma State for two seasons. In 1987 Drew became the head coach at traditionally-black Langston University in Oklahoma. Drew graduated from Fisk University in 1957 after a standout career playing basketball. Drew graduated from Wheatley High School in Houston, where he played basketball.

Drew is widely cited for one of his basketball-related quotes – "We have a great bunch of outside shooters. Unfortunately, all our games are played indoors."

Drew died after an automobile accident near Stillwater, Oklahoma on November 22, 2012.

Head coaching record

References

External links
 Kashmere Former Athletes Association – Back to Back Champs!
 Coaching Record

1935 births
2012 deaths
American men's basketball coaches
College men's basketball head coaches in the United States
Fisk Bulldogs basketball players
High school basketball coaches in the United States
Langston Lions basketball coaches
New Mexico State Aggies men's basketball coaches
Oklahoma State Cowboys basketball coaches
African-American basketball coaches
American men's basketball players
20th-century African-American sportspeople
21st-century African-American people